Juan Queipo de Llano y Valdés may refer to:
Juan Queipo de Llano y Valdés (bishop) (died 1643), Spanish Roman Catholic bishop
Juan Queipo de Llano y Valdés (archbishop) (1635–1713), South American Roman Catholic bishop